Beauty and the Beast is a 1983 Danish drama film written and directed by Nils Malmros. The film stars Line Arlien-Søborg as a sexually active 16-year-old and Jesper Klein as the father who struggles to accept his daughter's relationships with boys as well as his own jealousy. Malmros, who had worked with the young Arlien-Søborg on his coming-of-age drama, Tree of Knowledge, wrote the role of the daughter specifically for her.

Cast

Awards and nominations 
Both Arlien-Søborg and Klein won the 1984 Bodil and Robert awards for acting. Beauty and the Beast received the 1984 Bodil Award for Best Danish Film and Robert Award for Danish Film of the Year. The film was entered into the 34th Berlin International Film Festival.

References

External links 
 Skønheden og udyret at IMDb
 Skønheden og udyret, at Den Danske Film Database (In Danish)
 

1983 drama films
1983 films
Best Danish Film Bodil Award winners
Best Danish Film Robert Award winners
Danish drama films
1980s Danish-language films
Films directed by Nils Malmros